Thaanumella is a genus of minute salt marsh snails with an operculum,  aquatic gastropod mollusks in the family Assimineidae.

Species
Species within the genus Thaanumella include:
 Thaanumella angulosa
 Thaanumella cookei

References
 
 WoRMS info on the genus

 
Assimineidae
Taxonomy articles created by Polbot